The Diocese of Craina (Latin: Dioecesis Craynensis) was a Roman Catholic diocese located in Craina, Albania (modern day Skadarska Krajina). In 1921, it was restored as a Titular Episcopal See.

Ordinaries
Sabbas (1452-1454), first bishop and Uniate Greek
Pavle Dušman (1454-1457 Died), second bishop
John (1457-), Uniate Greek
sede vacante
André Zamonetic, O.P. (1476-1482) 
Giacomo de Suressi (Sulixio) (1482-1488 Resigned)
Francesco Quirini, (1495-1499 Appointed, Archbishop of Durrës)

See also
Catholic Church in Albania

References

Bibliography

Former Roman Catholic dioceses in Albania